The Guinea-Bissau women's national under-16 and under-17 basketball team is a national basketball team of Guinea-Bissau, administered by the Federacao de Basquetebol da Guinée Bissau.
It represents the country in international women's under-16 and under-17 (under age 16 and under age 17) basketball competitions.

It appeared at the 2008 FIBA Africa U16 Zonal Championship for Women.

See also
Guinea-Bissau women's national basketball team
Guinea-Bissau women's national under-19 basketball team
Guinea-Bissau men's national under-16 basketball team

References

External links
Guinea-Bissau Basketball Records at FIBA Archive

Basketball in Guinea-Bissau
Basketball teams in Guinea-Bissau
Women's national under-16 basketball teams
Basketball